Peketi Sivaram (Telugu: పేకేటి శివరాం) (8 October 1918 – 30 December 2006) was an Indian actor and director.

Life sketch
He was born on 8 October 1918 in Pekeru village, East Godavari district in the erstwhile Madras Presidency of British India, present day Andhra Pradesh.

He acted in many Telugu, Tamil and Kannada films, receiving recognition for the character Bhagavan in Devadasu (1953).

He directed a few Telugu and Kannada films including Chuttarikalu (1968), Bhale Abbayilu (1969), Kula Gouravam (1972) starring N. T. Rama Rao and Rajkumar.

He received the H. M. Reddy award in 2002.

He died in Chennai on 30 December 2006.

Personal life
He has five sons from two marriages, the second one to the actress Jayanthi. His sons are Krishna Mohan, Peketi Ranga Rao, Venku and Gopal Peketi (with his first wife) and with second wife Jayanthi - Krishna Kumar (ex-husband of Anu Prabhakar). With his first wife, he had four daughters: Laxmi, Shanti (wife of Thiagarajan), Rani Kumar Tindal (CA) and Poornima.

Peketi Ranga Rao is an art director while Thiagarajan is a film actor, producer and director. His grandson Prashanth, son of Thiagarajan, is also an actor in Tamil movies.

Filmography (partial)

References

External links

Male actors from Andhra Pradesh
20th-century Indian film directors
1918 births
2006 deaths
People from East Godavari district
Male actors in Telugu cinema
Indian male film actors
Male actors in Kannada cinema
20th-century Indian male actors
Film directors from Andhra Pradesh
Kannada film directors
Telugu film directors